Kremlin Mill is an unincorporated community in southwest Butler County, in the U.S. state of Missouri.

The mill was on the Little Black River approximately two miles west-southwest of Taft.

History
A post office called Kremlin Mills was in operation from 1878 until 1880, and a post office called Kremlin from 1887 until 1888. The community took its name from a nearby gristmill of the same name which in turn was named after the Moscow Kremlin in Russia.

References

Unincorporated communities in Butler County, Missouri
Unincorporated communities in Missouri